The Movement for the Social Evolution of Black Africa (MESAN) was a political party in the Central African Republic. In its original form, it was a nationalist quasi-religious party that sought to affirm black humanity and advocated for the independence of Ubangi-Shari, then a French colonial territory.

History 
The party, which was initially intended to work as a political movement, was founded by Barthélemy Boganda in Bangui, Ubangi-Shari (later known as the Central African Republic) on 28 September 1949, to connect "all the Blacks of the world" and "to promote the political, economic and social evolution of black Africa, to break down the barriers of tribalism and racism, to replace the degrading notion of colonial subordination with the more human ones of fraternity and cooperation."

The statutes of the movement were written in April 1950, and the group's branches were set up in Ubangui, Fort Lamy and Brazzaville. The formation of MESAN did not sit well with the French territorial administration. They set up divisions of the Rassemblement du Peuple Français (French People's Party, also known as RPF) in Ubangi-Shari to oppose the MESAN. The movement also encountered resistance in French Equatorial Africa from the Rassemblement Démocratique Africain (African Democratic Rally, RDA), a political party initially geared towards Pan-Africanism that later became hostile towards efforts for African independence.
 
In the Territorial Assembly elections in 1957, MESAN captured 347,000 out of the total 356,000 votes cast and won every legislative seat, which led to Boganda being elected president of the Grand Council of French Equatorial Africa and vice-president of the Ubangi-Shari Government Council. Within a year, he declared the establishment of the Central African Republic and served as the country's first prime minister. MESAN continued to exist, but its role was limited. After Boganda's death in a plane crash on 29 March 1959, Étienne N'Gounio, his confidant, became the head of MESAN, but Boganda's cousin, David Dacko was named as the replacement as the Head of State in a session in April 1959. Dacko won by 39 votes against his opponent Abel Goumba's 11, despite Goumba being supported by N'Gounio. The party won every seat in the 1959 elections, with Dacko becoming the country's first president after the CAR formally received independence from France. Dacko threw out his political rivals, including former Prime Minister and Mouvement d'évolution démocratique de l'Afrique centrale (MEDAC) leader Abel Goumba, who he forced into exile in France. He secured the leadership of the party by hastily organising a party congress whilst N'Gounio was out of the capital in July 1960, therefore taking full control of the party. With all opposition parties suppressed by November 1962, Dacko declared MESAN as the official party of the state. MESAN won every seat again in the 1964 elections, whilst Dacko was re-elected as President in an unopposed election.

On 31 December 1965, General Jean-Bédel Bokassa, a cousin of both Boganda and Dacko, seized power in the CAR through a coup d'état. The next day, 1 January 1966, he proclaimed himself president, prime minister, and head of MESAN. Bokassa stayed in power for the next 13 years. In 1972, he appointed Elisabeth Domitien as vice president of the party, and three years later as prime minister, a first for any woman of an African nation. At the MESAN congress on 4 December 1976, Bokassa instituted a new constitution and declared the republic a monarchy, to be known as the Central African Empire. In September 1979, Bokassa was overthrown and Dacko once again became president of the CAR. On 24 November 1979, he abolished MESAN and replaced it with the Union Démocratique Centrafricaine, which he proclaimed as the new political party for the CAR.

The party was re-established after the return of multi-party politics in the early 1990s. In the 1993 general elections it won a single seat in the National Assembly.

The party nominated only one candidate for the 2011 elections, failing to win a seat.

Electoral history

Presidential elections

National Assembly elections

Footnotes

Sources

See also
 Movement for the Social Evolution of Black Africa–Boganda

1949 establishments in Ubangi-Shari
1979 disestablishments in the Central African Republic
African and Black nationalist parties in Africa
Anti-imperialist organizations
Black political parties
National liberation movements in Africa
Parties of one-party systems
Political parties disestablished in 1979
Political parties established in 1949
Political parties in the Central African Republic
Progressive parties